
This is a list of the Areas of Special Scientific Interest (ASSIs) in County Down in Northern Ireland, United Kingdom.

In Northern Ireland the body responsible for designating ASSIs is the Northern Ireland Environment Agency – a division of the Department of Environment (DoE).

Unlike the SSSIs, ASSIs include both natural environments and man-made structures. As with SSSIs, these sites are designated if they have criteria based on fauna, flora, geological or physiographical features. On top of this, structures are also covered, such as the Whitespots mines in Conlig, according to several criterion including rarity, recorded history and intrinsic appeal.

For other sites in the rest of the United Kingdom, see List of SSSIs by Area of Search.

Data is available from the Northern Ireland Environment Agency's website in the form of citation sheets for each ASSI.

 Ballybannan ASSI
 Ballycam ASSI
 Ballykilbeg ASSI
 Ballynagross Lower ASSI
 Ballyquintin Point ASSI
 Black Lough ASSI
 Blaeberry Island Bog ASSI
 Carlingford Lough ASSI
 Carrowcarlin ASSI
 Castle Enigan ASSI
 Castlewellan Lake ASSI
 Clarehill ASSI
 Corbally ASSI
 Craigantlet Woods ASSI
 Derryleckagh ASSI
 Eastern Mournes ASSI
 Greenan ASSI
 Greenan Lough ASSI
 Gruggandoo ASSI
 Heron and Carrigullian Loughs ASSI
 Hollymount ASSI
 Inner Belfast Lough ASSI
 Kilbroney River ASSI
 Killard ASSI
 Killough Bay and Strand Lough ASSI
 Lackan Bog ASSI
 Lough Cowey ASSI
 Lough Neagh ASSI
 Loughkeelan ASSI
 Loughmoney ASSI
 Murlough ASSI
 Outer Ards ASSI
 Outer Belfast Lough ASSI
 Quoile ASSI
 Rostrevor Wood ASSI
 Scrabo ASSI
 Sheepland Coast ASSI
 Shimna River ASSI
 Strangford Lough Part I ASSI
 Strangford Lough Part II ASSI
 Strangford Lough Part III ASSI
 Tieveshilly ASSI
 Tullyratty ASSI
 Turmennan ASSI
 Woodgrange ASSI

References

Areas of Special Scientific Interest in Northern Ireland
Geography of County Down
Areas of Special Scientific